For people with the surname, see Skarstedt (surname).

Skarstedt is a contemporary art gallery with locations in New York, London, Paris, and East Hampton.

History
The gallery was founded in 1992 by art dealer Per Skarstedt. Skarstedt's first acquisition, at the age of 23, was a work by Richard Prince.

Skarstedt moved to New York and opened his first Upper East Side gallery at 1018 Madison Avenue in 1992. In 2007, the gallery moved into 20 East 79th Street, the former gallery of Paul Rosenberg & Co., designed by Francis d'Haene. In 2019, Skarstedt opened a second space in New York’s Upper East Side, located in a 25,000-square-foot space at 19 East 64th Street.

In 2012, Skarstedt expanded with a gallery in London at 8 Bennett Street, designed by Thomas Croft.

Skarstedt opened its East Hampton gallery in 2020 at 66 Newtown Ln. That same year, Skarstedt opened a pop-up in Palm Beach, exhibiting Richard Prince Nurses and new sculptures by KAWS.

The gallery also opened its first location in Paris in 2021, at 2 Avenue Matignon, designed by Jacques Granges.

Artists
The gallery is known for its focus on contemporary artists such as:
 Cristina BanBan (since 2022)
 Georg Baselitz
 George Condo
 Eric Fischl (since 2015)
 KAWS
 Barbara Kruger
 Albert Oehlen
 Richard Prince
 David Salle
 Cindy Sherman
 Sue Williams

In addition, the gallery manages various artist estates, including: 
 Martin Kippenberger (in collaboration with Galerie Gisela Capitain)
 Andy Warhol

References 

Contemporary art galleries in the United States